Hans-Peter Schulze (born 21 October 1939) is a German fencer. He competed for East Germany in the individual and team épée events at the 1968 and 1972 Summer Olympics.

References

1939 births
Living people
German male fencers
Olympic fencers of East Germany
Fencers at the 1968 Summer Olympics
Fencers at the 1972 Summer Olympics
Sportspeople from Leipzig